Jeremy Reich (born February 11, 1979) is a Canadian former professional ice hockey player. Reich was a grinder known for his physical play and fighting. He currently serves in an assistant G.M and assistant coach with the Canmore Eagles of the Alberta Junior Hockey League (AJHL).

Playing career
After playing minor hockey with the Saskatoon Contacts of the Saskatchewan Midget AAA Hockey League (SMAAAHL), Reich began his major junior career in the Western Hockey League (WHL) with the Seattle Thunderbirds in 1995–96. After his second WHL season, he was drafted 39th overall in the 1997 NHL Entry Draft by the Chicago Blackhawks. Upon being drafted, he remained in the WHL and during the 1997–98 season, he was traded from Seattle to the Swift Current Broncos in exchange for Jeffrey Beatch on December 20, 1997.

Reich played his last WHL season with the Broncos in 1999–2000, turning pro the following season in the American Hockey League (AHL) with the Syracuse Crunch. He made his NHL debut in the 2003–04 season with the Columbus Blue Jackets, playing in 9 games and registering 1 assist during a call-up. Late in the 2004–05 AHL season, back with the Crunch, he was loaned to the Houston Aeros on March 10, 2005, in exchange for the loan of Jason Beckett. That off-season, he was signed as a free agent by the Boston Bruins on September 7, 2005. He subsequently began playing with Boston's AHL affiliate, the Providence Bruins. During the 2007–08 season, Reich scored his first NHL goal against his former team, the Columbus Blue Jackets, in a 2–0 win on December 15, 2007.

On July 2, 2009, Reich signed as a free agent to a one-year, two-way contract with the New York Islanders. Assigned to the Islanders AHL affiliate, the Bridgeport Sound Tigers for 2009–10, Reich scored 12 goals in 33 games in an injury blighted season.

On July 1, 2010, Reich returned to the Boston Bruins organization by signing a one-year contract. He was reassigned to Providence where he remainder for the entire 2010–11 season, scoring 23 points in 72 games.

On April 30, 2011, Reich signed a one-year contract with German team, ERC Igolstadt, of the DEL.

Career statistics

Transactions
December 20, 1997 - Traded from the Seattle Thunderbirds to the Swift Current Broncos in exchange for Jeffrey Beatch.
March 10, 2005 - Loaned to the Houston Aeros from the Syracuse Crunch in exchange for the loan of Jason Beckett.
September 7, 2005 - Signed as a free agent by the Boston Bruins.
June 2, 2009 - Signed as a free agent by the New York Islanders.
July 1, 2010 - Signed as a free agent by the Boston Bruins.

References

External links

1979 births
Living people
Boston Bruins players
Bridgeport Sound Tigers players
Canadian ice hockey left wingers
Chicago Blackhawks draft picks
Columbus Blue Jackets players
ERC Ingolstadt players
Houston Aeros (1994–2013) players
Ice hockey people from Saskatchewan
People from Craik, Saskatchewan
Providence Bruins players
Seattle Thunderbirds players
Swift Current Broncos players
Syracuse Crunch players
Canadian expatriate ice hockey players in Germany